The Nerganița is a left tributary of the river Nera in Romania.

References

Rivers of Romania
Rivers of Caraș-Severin County